Žbince is a village and municipality in Michalovce District in the Kosice Region of eastern Slovakia. It has a population of about 950.

General information

History
In historical records the village was first mentioned in 1221.

Ethnicity
The population is about 90% Slovak and 10% Roma in ethnicity.

Buildings and infrastructure
The village has a church, St Anna's Church, which was built in 1323 along with a small public library, a gymnasium and a football pitch; but the nearest railway station is in the adjacent village Hatalov.

Gallery

See also
 List of municipalities and towns in Michalovce District
 List of municipalities and towns in Slovakia

References

External links

http://www.statistics.sk/mosmis/eng/run.html

Villages and municipalities in Michalovce District